The Bethel Threshers are the athletic teams that represent Bethel College, located in North Newton, Kansas, in intercollegiate sports as a member of the National Association of Intercollegiate Athletics (NAIA), primarily competing in the Kansas Collegiate Athletic Conference (KCAC) since the 1939–40 academic year and in which they were a member on a previous stint from 1902–03 to December 1928 (of the 1928–29 school year).

Nickname
Bethel's athletic teams were known at the Graymaroons from the 1920s until 1960, when the Threshers fight name was adopted.

Varsity sports
Bethel competes in 17 intercollegiate varsity sports: Men's sports include basketball, cross country, football, golf, soccer, tennis and track and field; while women's sports include basketball, cross country, flag football (added in fall 2022), soccer, softball, tennis, track and field and volleyball; and co-ed sports include cheerleading and dance.

Basketball
Bethel's basketball program is led by head coach Jayson Artaz. Since taking over in 2018 and as of completion of the 2021 season, Artaz’s teams have complied a record of 83 wins and 43 losses.

Notable Basketball Players
  Jaylon Scott

Cross country and track & field
Bethel's track & field team has found success on the national level.  In 2008, Jeff Buller won his second consecutive national championship in the javelin with a throw of 214 feet 8 inches.

Football
Bethel College began its football program in 1914 under head coach William E. Schroeder. As of completion of the 2022 season, the teams have produced a cumulative record of 328 wins, 529 losses, and 13 ties.

From 2019 through 2021, Terry Harrison led the Threshers to back-to-back conference titles in 2020 and 2021 before resigning to accept the head coaching position at Friends University. Harrison replaced Morris Lolar and finished his tenure at Bethel with 37 wins and 14 losses.

The current head coach is A.B. Stokes. Stokes led the Threshers to their third consecutive conference title in 2022. His current record at Bethel is 9 wins and 1 loss.

References

External links